Since 1994, inFORM Decisions has been a developer and distributor of electronic document automation and payment automation software for IBM i (System i, AS/400, iSeries) and IBM Power Systems computing environments. Designed to burst, sort, format and distribute reports and provide simplified web access to electronic documents, iDocs works with any IBM i-based ERP/accounting software with no additional coding. inFORM Decisions was one of the first IBM Business Partners to implement a comprehensive eDocument distribution system powered by intelligent routing capabilities for fax, email, archive-retrieval, and laser forms.

History
inFORM Decisions was founded in 1994 by Dan Forster.  Its focus then was to provide simple, IBM AS/400-based (now known as IBM i) utilities to address the growing need to efficiently manage printed documents from applications. In the ensuing years, this expanded into the development of electronic document output applications, re-mapped forms and reports, MICR check technologies, faxing applications, bar code applications, document archive/retrieval, signature pad applications, and more, all of which have grown rapidly in recent years.

inFORM's worldwide headquarters are located in the Orange County area of Southern California in the city of Rancho Santa Margarita.

Platforms
IBM i
System i
AS/400
iSeries
IBM Power Systems
Windows Server

References

Software companies based in California
Software companies of the United States